Bobbington is a civil parish in the district of South Staffordshire, Staffordshire, England. It contains eleven listed buildings that are recorded in the National Heritage List for England. Of these, two are at Grade II*, the middle of the three grades, and the others are at Grade II, the lowest grade. The parish contains the village of Bobbington, and is otherwise rural. The listed buildings consist of a church, houses and farmhouses with associated structures, farm buildings, and a cottage.


Key

Buildings

References

Citations

Sources

Lists of listed buildings in Staffordshire
South Staffordshire District